American chop suey is an American pasta casserole made with ground beef, macaroni and a seasoned tomato sauce, found in the cuisine of New England and other regions of the United States. Outside New England it is sometimes called American goulash or Johnny Marzetti, among other names. Despite its name, it has only a very distant relation to the chop suey of Chinese and American Chinese cuisine.

Though this comfort food is influenced by Italian-American cuisine as well as older New England quick and practical meals like the "potato bargain" and "necessity mess," it is known as "American chop suey" both because it is a sometimes-haphazard hodgepodge of meat, vegetables and Italian seasonings, and because it once used rice, a base ingredient in Chinese cuisine, instead of pasta.

Standard American chop suey consists of elbow macaroni and bits of cooked ground beef with sautéed onions in a thick tomato-based sauce. The dish can be served on a plate or in a bowl, usually accompanied by bread and often Worcestershire sauce.

See also 
 American goulash
 Chili mac
 Makarony po-flotski
 List of pasta dishes
 List of regional dishes of the United States

References 

New England cuisine
Italian-American cuisine
Ground meat
American pasta dishes
American meat dishes
Casserole dishes